KBBG (88.1 FM) is a non-commercial educational radio station licensed to serve the community of Waterloo, Iowa.  KBBG is owned by Afro American Community Broadcasting, Inc and is organized as a 501(C)3 tax-exempt organization. Jimmie Porter founded the corporation in 1977 with a group of 16 other Waterloo residents. He remained active in its leadership, along with a board of directors, until his death in 2007.

KBBG began broadcasting on July 26, 1978 using a 10 watt transmitter, and upgraded on December 27, 1980 to 9,500 watts of power.

KBBG is a member-supported station of the Corporation for Public Broadcasting and is an affiliate of American Urban Radio Network (SBN).

KBBG is broadcasting using the HD Radio digital format as well as traditional analog audio.

See also
List of community radio stations in the United States

External links
 

BBG
NPR member stations
Community radio stations in the United States